The Patriarch of Antioch was the head of the Church of Antioch. According to tradition, the bishopric of Antioch was established by Saint Peter in the 1st century AD and was later elevated to the status of patriarchate by the First Council of Nicaea in 325. The church first underwent schism after the deposition of Eustathius in 330 over the issue of the Arian controversy and persisted until its resolution in 414.

After the Council of Chalcedon of 451, the church suffered division until the deposition of Patriarch Severus of Antioch in 518 resulted in a permanent schism from which two separate lines of patriarchs emerged. The Non-Chalcedonian supporters of Severus went on to form what is now known as the Syriac Orthodox Church, whilst the Chalcedonians developed the church now known as the Greek Orthodox Church of Antioch.

List of patriarchs

Bishops of Antioch to 324
Unless otherwise stated, all information is derived from Chronologies of the Ancient World: Names, Dates and Dynasties and The Oxford Dictionary of Late Antiquity, as noted in the bibliography below.
Peter I (/47–/54)
Evodius (/54–/83)
Ignatius (– or –115)
Heron I (/116–/128)
Cornelius (/128–/154)
Heron II (– or –)
vacant (–)
Theophilus (–182)
Maximus I (182–190/191)
Serapion (190/191–211/212)
Asclepiades (211/212–217/218/220)
Philetus (217/218/220–230/231)
Zebinnus (231–237)
Babylas (237–250/251)
Fabius (250/251–253/256)
Demetrius (253/256–260/261)
Paul (260/261–268/272)
Domnus I (268–273)
Timaeus (273–279/280)
Cyril (279/280–303)
Tyrannion (304–314)
Vitalis (314–320)
Philogonius (320–324)

Patriarchs of Antioch from 324 to 360
Eustathius (324–330)
Paulinus I (330)
Eulalius (331–332)
Euphronius (332–333)
Flacillus (333–342)
Stephen I (342–344)
Leontius (344–357)
Eudoxius (358–359)
Annanius (359)

Patriarchs of Antioch from 360 to 414

Meletian line
Meletius (360–381)
Flavian I (381–404)
Porphyrus (404–414)

Arian line
Euzoius (360/361–376)
Dorotheus (376–381)

Nicene line
Paulinus II (362–388)
Evagrius (388–392/393)

Apollinarist line
Vitalis (375)

Patriarchs of Antioch from 414 to 518
Alexander (414–417)
Theodotus (417–428)
John I (429–441)
Domnus II (441–449)

Chalcedonian line
Maximus II (450–455)
Basil (456–458)
Acacius (458–459)
Martyrius (459–471)
Peter II (471)
Julian (471–475)
Peter II (475–477)
John II Codonatus (477)
Stephen II (477–479)
Stephen III (disputed)
Calendion (479–484)
Peter II (485–488)
Palladius (488–498)
Flavian II (498–512)
Severus (512–518)

Non-Chalcedonian line
Maximus II  (450–455)
Basil (456–458)
Acacius (458–459)
Martyrius (459–471)
Peter II (471)
Julian (471–475)
Peter II (475–477)
John II Codonatus (477)
Stephen II (477–479)
Stephen III (disputed)
Calendion (479–484)
Peter II (485–488)
Palladius (488–498)
Flavian II (498–512)
Severus (512–518)

Patriarchs of Antioch from 518 to present
List of Greek Orthodox patriarchs of Antioch
List of Syriac Orthodox patriarchs of Antioch

List of Maronite patriarchs of Antioch
List of Syriac Catholic patriarchs of Antioch
List of Melkite Greek Catholic Patriarchs of Antioch

References
Notes

Citations

Bibliography

Antioch
Turkey religion-related lists
Syria religion-related lists